1. SC Feucht is a German association football club from Feucht, a market town close to the city of Nuremberg, Bavaria.

The club's greatest success has been promotion to the tier-three Regionalliga Süd in 2003, where it played for two seasons before being relegated again in 2005.

History
Fußball Club Feucht was established as the town's first football team in 1920 and renamed Sportclub Feucht in 1923. The club was dissolved in 1925 and 1. SC Feucht emerged as its successor in 1927.

The team played in lower-level local competition until winning its way into the Landesliga Bayern-Mitte (V) in 1995. Two years later that advance was followed by promotion to the Bayernliga (IV) and then, in 2003, to the Regionalliga Süd (III). However, the club was unable to sustain itself financially at that level and, despite finishing clear of the relegation zone, voluntarily withdrew to the Bayernliga in 2005 after beginning bankruptcy proceedings in February that year. New sponsorship briefly secured the club's position, but it again faced insolvency in March 2007. The team competed in the Landesliga Bayern-Mitte after being sent down following a 19th-place finish in 2006–07. In this league, the club struggled, too, finishing 14th and having to secure survival through a post-season decider against SC Eltersdorf, which Feucht won.

In 2008–09, the club suffered another relegation, now to the Bezirksoberliga Mittelfranken (VII). Changes in the league system in 2012 meant that the club, after a championship in the Bezirksoberliga, qualified for the promotion round to the newly expanded Bayernliga. After a first round victory over SV Buckenhofen the club was knocked out in the second round by DJK Don Bosco Bamberg and failed to qualify for the Bayernliga but earned Landesliga promotion instead. At the end of the 2013–14, Feucht was moved to the Nordost division of the Landesliga. The following season the club won the league and earned promotion back to the Bayernliga.

Stadium
1. SC Feucht plays its home fixtures in the Waldstadion, which has a capacity of 3,500. In the 2007–08 season, the club had the second-worst support in its league, an average of 154 spectators per match.

Honours
The club's honours:

League
 Bayernliga (IV)
 Champions: 2003
 Landesliga Bayern-Mitte (V)
 Champions: 1997
 Landesliga Bayern-Nordost
 Champions (2): 2015, 2021
 Bezirksoberliga Mittelfranken
 Champions (2): 1995, 2012

Cup
 Mittelfranken Cup
 Runners-up: 1996, 1999, 2001

Recent managers
Recent managers of the club:

Recent seasons
The recent season-by-season performance of the club:

With the introduction of the Bezirksoberligas in 1988 as the new fifth tier, below the Landesligas, all leagues below dropped one tier. With the introduction of the Regionalligas in 1994 and the 3. Liga in 2008 as the new third tier, below the 2. Bundesliga, all leagues below dropped one tier. With the establishment of the Regionalliga Bayern as the new fourth tier in Bavaria in 2012 the Bayernliga was split into a northern and a southern division, the number of Landesligas expanded from three to five and the Bezirksoberligas abolished. All leagues from the Bezirksligas onwards were elevated one tier.

References

Sources
Grüne, Hardy (2001). Vereinslexikon. Kassel: AGON Sportverlag

External links
 Official team site
 Abseits Guide to German Soccer
 1. SC Feucht at Weltfussball.de
 Das deutsche Fußball-Archiv historical German domestic league tables (in German)

Association football clubs established in 1920
Football clubs in Germany
Football clubs in Bavaria
Football in Middle Franconia
1920 establishments in Germany
Nürnberger Land